is a private university in Hachiōji, Tokyo, Japan. The predecessor of the school was founded in May 1947. After becoming a vocational school in 1953, it was chartered as a university in 1986.

External links
 

Educational institutions established in 1947
Private universities and colleges in Japan
Universities and colleges in Tokyo
1947 establishments in Japan
Engineering universities and colleges in Japan
Hachiōji, Tokyo